Atherton Whiskey was a pre-prohibition brand of Kentucky Straight Bourbon whiskey first produced by J M Atherton & Co, a chemical and distilling business.

First bottled and marketed in 1867, it was once part of the largest whiskey making operation in Kentucky.

The J. M. Atherton Company (1867–1899)
The  J M Atherton Company was established in an area now known as Athertonville, Kentucky in 1867 
 by John McDougal Atherton, who had entered into this profession as a young man with Marshall Key, his stepfather as a large investor. Company headed paper from 1872 refers to J.M. Atherton & Co and immediately underneath in larger font “Distiller’s of pure copper whisky” (whiskey without an “e”). Once the company reached 200 employees, it became the largest employer in  LaRue County. Shipments would leave by rail from the New Haven Depot across the river in Nelson County, via a rail extension from the distilleries in LaRue County. Other business enterprises to support the distiller followed, such as a store and the Atherton Hotel in the 1890’s. Already with a courthouse and a new school; soon after it was named in honor of John M Atherton, who had brought prosperity to many of the inhabitants.

Atherton and Mayfield were the companies two largest distilleries, followed by Windsor and Clifton.  All four were located in Athertonville and registered to a location in New Haven, Kentucky. John M Atherton appointed his cousin, Alexander Mayfield, as manager of the Mayfield distillery, naming the plant in his honor. The other local distilleries under The J M Atherton Company were the  Clifton and  Windsor distilleries.

List of whiskey brands produced by J. M. Atherton & Co 

By the end of 1881, the company had on its books orders of 55,000 barrels of its several brands.

In 1882 The J. M. Atherton Company headquarters moved to Whiskey Row, Louisville on 125 W Main St. This historic area of the city is now referred to as West Main District, Louisville. As the founders’ interests moved on into the real estate business, his son Peter Lee Atherton, took over the management of all distillery operations, as vice president. 

During this time the company portfolio included a total of four distilleries within LaRue County, making them the largest product of Bourbon by volume in the United States.

John M Atherton was a leader in the Kentucky distilling industry, active within the Distillers and Cattle Feeders' Trust. Known as the “Whiskey Trust”, it started to receive scrutiny from politicians at a national level. A congressional committee was set up, and headed by William Windom. John M Atherton testified before Congress about issues involving taxation and the bonding period for whiskey. On July 27, 1888, he provided congressmen an insight into many aspects of the distilling industry and the Whiskey Trust.

In 1890, the company used 2,200 bushels of grain and produced 6,600 gallons of Whiskey. Their maximum storage capacity at Athertonville, Kentucky was 150,000 gallons.

However, it was a time when some unsavory Distiller's were bottling paint thinner, or at best, adding a splash of caramel coloring, and calling it whiskey. Such actions resulted in the passing of the  Bottled-in-Bond Act of 1897 legislation to protect the consumer and raise product standards. To comply, J. M. Atherton and their competitors had to ensure their product was from only one distillation season. It also had to be distilled by them at one distillery and be at least four years old. It had to be stored and aged in government bonded warehouses; be at least 100 proof, and absolutely nothing (except water) could be added. J. M. Atherton specified “Bottled in bond” on all their product line, in attempts to reassure the consumer.

After more than 30 years with John M Atherton at the helm, the brand and all the company assets were acquired by the Whiskey Trust. The J. M. Atherton Company was officially transferred to a holding company of the Whiskey Trust; the Kentucky Distilleries & Warehouse Company in May 1899. At the time of sale, the company had a total production at all four distilleries of 350 barrels a day and warehousing for over 200,000 barrels.

The sale of the company was reported in the New York Times on May 12, 1899.

The Whiskey Trust and the Julius Kessler (1899–1920)
The Kentucky Distilleries & Warehouse Company, a manifestation of the “Whiskey Trust”, was set up initially to consolidate and bring regulation to the US whiskey industry. However very quickly it started taking control of many bourbon distilleries with Coon Hollow Whiskey (1881).

The Whiskey Trust assumed ownership  in 1889. In November they sold 85,000 barrels for $1,000,000.

General management of all operations was soon after handled by Julius Kessler, who was based in Chicago. In 1909 he announced his retirement from the whiskey business, although that appears not to have occurred, resulting in greater independence from the Whiskey Trust. He went on to register brand “Atherton” as a US patent in 1911.

His operations, including his own brand Kessler Whiskey, were forced to close with the enactment of Prohibition in 1920.

The Prohibition era (1920–1933)
Most of the former Atherton distilleries did not survive  prohibition. With the onset of the Sherman Anti-Trust Act, the Whiskey Trust would eventually become part of American Medicinal Spirits Company in 1927. During prohibition they produced "medicinal whiskey" under the Atherton brand in one pint bottles for sick, blind, and non-mobile patients. They evolved into the National Distillers Group. None of the original Atherton brand names were used after this period ended.

Cummings Distillery Corporation of Athertonville (1933–1946)
The “mothballed” Atherton distillery, 
complete with plant and equipment
was acquired and rebuilt by Arthur J. Cummings Jr. and a partner in 1933. It was renamed the Cummins-Collins distillery. 
 Production resumed on August 13, 1935 after being shut down for seventeen years. On September 26, 1935 it was reported that orders were so great, they doubled the mashing. By the time of commencing production it was renamed the Cummings Distillery Corporation of Athertonville. Their brands included “A.J. Cummins Kentucky Straight Bourbon” and “Singing Sam Whiskey”. However the site fell into disrepair with Cummings closing down the plant shortly before it was acquired by the Seagram Company in 1946.

Seagrams Athertonville distillery (1946–1972)
The Athertonville distillery supported Seagram's extensive portfolio of blended whiskeys. The core of the facility was destroyed by a fire on February 19, 1972 and put over 50 employees out of work. This story was covered in depth in the Kentucky Standard on February 24, 1972. A fire had broken out in the still house about 3:40 a.m. Fire crew fought the blaze for four hours, containing the fire within the brick walls. The power house, fermenting room and evaporator escaped damage and did not spread to 
the three warehouses where the whiskey was stored. All distillery operations ceased on the old Atherton site after this date. 
 
Since 1990, warehouses at the former distillery site have been used by an independent company specializing in the manufacture of whiskey barrels.

See also
 List of historic whisky distilleries
 Bourbon whiskey
 American whiskey
 Bottled in bond

References

Further reading
Penobscot Bay Pilot: March 26, 2013 Edition: “What it’s like to sip a $150 glass of pre-Prohibition whiskey”

Defunct companies based in Kentucky
Distilleries in Kentucky
Bourbon whiskey
Economy of Louisville, Kentucky
American brands
1867 introductions
1867 establishments in Kentucky
American drink distillers